Shota Abkhazava (born 12 August 1971) is a Georgian-Russian racing driver, race car designer, businessman, and owner of three race tracks in Russia, Georgia and Latvia.

Racing
In 1993 Abkhazava graduated from the Moscow State Automobile and Road Technical University (MADI) trained as race cars engineer. While studying, he was involved into the "Astrada" and "Gardarika" single seater projects. He worked in the MADI Laboratory of Sport Cars, a famous Soviet and Russian car design bureau. In 1998 he established his first race cars design company and a team named "Pilot F3 Engineering". In 1999 the team competed in the very front in the Formula Three Championship of Russia, with Italian driver Fabio Babini at the wheel of the most up-to-date Formula 3 car "Dallara F399". A year after, the team has changed its name to "ArtLine Engineering", and in 2001 another Italian pilot, Maurizio Mediani, brought the first Champion's title to ArtLine.
In 2003 Abkhazava moulded the team from Formula 3 into the national Formula 1600. After a year he announced that the team is ready to use new chassis of its own design, named ArtTech. Meanwhile, for the first time he was elected into the Committee for Circuit Racing of the Russian Automobile Federation as a coordinator of the national Formula 1600. In November 2004 the ArtTech race car was presented to public during "Sport Motor Tuning Exhibition" in Moscow.

In 2005 he run one of the first Russian sports marketing seminars, "Sportsmarketing 2005". Managed by Abkhazava, Formula 1600 was top-ranked as "class of the year" by Russian leading motorsports blog "iloveracing.ru". Abkhazava initiated his first race track project "ADM Raceway" at the Miachkovo airfield. On 23 July 2006 new circuit hosted the first official competitions. After Neva-Ring circuit in St-Petersburg was destroyed, Miachkovo became the only permanent circuit in the Western part of the country, effectively saving national circuit racing from death.

In 2006 Abkhazava argued against Russian Automobile Federation accusing them of deviation from democratic principles. In 2007 he was often invited to be a guest of “Countdown” TV program, a part of Formula One live broadcast to Russia on the RenTV channel.  The team won Russian Championship and several laps of the Formula 3 Championship of Finland.

In September 2008, for the first time in history, Abkhazava introduced North Europe Formula 3 Cup (NEZ Cup)  that was held at the ADM Raceway near Moscow. At the end of the year he brought to Russia new racing class “Legend Cars”  which produced in Harrisburg, NC. In December he took part in the Las Vegas Grand Finals of the Legend cars and came 2rd in the Semi-Pro group.

In 2009 Abkhazava’s team started to compete in the German ATS Formula-3 Cup with its own chassis ArtTech and won Trophy title. Abkhazava went to Georgian market as a businessman  and sport event organizer. In the meantime he raced in Russian and Georgian Legends competitions and won both the titles.

After successful season of 2010, Abkhazava announced that since 2011 the Formula-3 team moves to the most competitive class of the German cup, “League A”. In October, 2011 he came first in Spa in the final stage of EU Legends Championship.

In December 2011 Abkhazava proceeded with Rustavi race track reconstruction with $25-million private investments of his own. The track is officially opened in April, 2012, getting a new name of “Rustavi International Motorpark”. Acting as a president of local motorsport governing body, Georgian AutoSport Association (GASA), within a year he established two new racing series, Legends and Formula Alfa that puts Georgia on the top motorsports level among the Post-Soviet states.

Racing career
Following the Drivers Database, Abkhazava has participated in 71 races and won 32 of them. In 2008 he came 2nd in the Legends World Finals as a semi-pro driver, in 2011 he finished 3rd in Pro division. Since 2008, he also won Russian Legend Cup title three times. In the 2012th Georgian Championship he was top-ranked with the most wins (6), pole-positions (7) and fastest laps (3).

In 2014, Abkhazava joined the Lamborghini Blancpain Super Trofeo series, the “fastest brand trophy of the world“, for Automobili Lamborghini Racing Team Luxemburg. He started the season at Monza, achieving second position of the standings after taking two second places in the AM group and 11th overall. In 2015, Shota Abkhazava won the AM title, racing with his own team Artline Georgia.

He is currently competing in the 2020 Russian Circuit Racing Series for ArtLine in the Sports Prototype CN class in a Legends car.

External links
 Rustavi International Motorpark
 ADM Raceway Moscow
 Lamborghini Super Trofeo Series

References

Russian racing drivers
Living people
1971 births
Russian Circuit Racing Series drivers
Georgian racing drivers
Lamborghini Super Trofeo drivers